Morir soñando (To die dreaming) is a popular beverage of the Dominican Republic which has made its way to other Caribbean and Latin American countries, usually made of orange juice, milk, cane sugar, and chopped ice. Sometimes vanilla extract is also added, or evaporated milk is used instead of regular milk. The recipe varies greatly depending on the region and family heritage. American observers have described the drink as resembling an orange Creamsicle, or the eponymous drink of Orange Julius.

Morir Soñando has gained some popularity in Puerto Rico where vanilla, lemon or lime zest is added. Chironja, blood oranges, or tangerines can replace oranges, the drink is still received as morir soñando, limbre (coconut-cinnamon base Puerto Rican ice-cream), and piragua.

Notes

External links
Recipe at Dominicancooking.com

Non-alcoholic mixed drinks
Dominican Republic cuisine